The 2020 Nobel Peace Prize was awarded to the World Food Programme (founded in 1961) by the Norwegian Nobel Committee. The announcement was made on Friday 9 October at 11:00 CEST.

Candidates
There were 318 candidates for the 2020 Nobel Peace Prize (211 individuals and 107 organizations), which is the fourth largest number in the history of the prize. However, the Norwegian Nobel Committee does not reveal the names of nominators nor of the nominees for the Nobel Peace Prize before 50 years have passed. Full professors in relevant academic fields and national-level politicians in any country may propose candidates, and it does not require an invitation to submit a nomination; sometimes nominators make their proposals public, but the committee does not verify nominations.

Nobel Committee 
Tasked with reviewing nominations from September of the previous year through 1 February and ultimately selecting the Prize winners, the Norwegian Parliament-appointed members of the Norwegian Nobel Committee at the time of the 2020 prize were listed as:

Berit Reiss-Andersen (chair, born 1954), advocate (barrister) and president of the Norwegian Bar Association, former state secretary for the Minister of Justice and the Police (representing the Labour Party). Member of the Norwegian Nobel Committee since 2012, reappointed for the period 2018–2023.
Henrik Syse (vice chair, born 1966), Research Professor at the Peace Research Institute Oslo. Member of the Committee since 2015, appointed for the period 2015–2020
Thorbjørn Jagland (born 1950), former Prime Minister and Member of Parliament for the Labour Party, former President of the Storting during Jens Stoltenberg's second term; as well as a former Secretary General of the Council of Europe. Chair of the Norwegian Nobel Committee from 2009 to 2015. Currently regular member. Member of the Committee since 2009, reappointed for the period 2015–2020.
Anne Enger (born 1949), former Leader of the Centre Party and Minister of Culture. Appointed for the period 2018–2020
Asle Toje (born 1974), foreign policy scholar. Appointed for the period 2018–2023.

References 

2020
2020 awards
World Food Programme